Kairos is a U.S based private company that builds products in the housing and healthcare sectors. Founded in 2008 by Ankur Jain, it is headquartered in New York City. As of 2017, the firm managed US$25 million to invest in affordable housing & personal health startups.

History 
Kairos was launched in 2008 by Ankur Jain while at Wharton Business School as a talent incubator.

Some founders from Kairos later founded Periscope, Casper, FiscalNote, and Digital Genius.

Kairos has launched several companies in their focus areas. Rhino is an alternative to security deposits for renters. Little Spoon is a direct-to-consumer baby product brand. Cera is a homecare service for the elderly based in the United Kingdom.

The firm spun out an early stage venture fund, K50, which focuses on financial services products at the pre-seed and seed stages.

References 

Financial services companies established in 2008
2008 establishments in the United States
Venture capital firms of the United States
Startup accelerators
Companies based in New York City